Burswood is a residential suburb of Auckland which is separated from the rest of the city by the Pakuranga Stream on its west, north and eastern sides, and the major road Ti Rakau Drive on its south. Population density is higher than in most of Auckland, with no quarter acre sections.

Demographics

Burswood had a population of 1,695 at the 2018 New Zealand census, an increase of 72 people (4.4%) since the 2013 census, and a decrease of 39 people (−2.2%) since the 2006 census. There were 549 households, comprising 834 males and 861 females, giving a sex ratio of 0.97 males per female. The median age was 36.1 years (compared with 37.4 years nationally), with 318 people (18.8%) aged under 15 years, 327 (19.3%) aged 15 to 29, 858 (50.6%) aged 30 to 64, and 195 (11.5%) aged 65 or older.

Ethnicities were 39.3% European/Pākehā, 6.4% Māori, 7.3% Pacific peoples, 50.8% Asian, and 5.7% other ethnicities. People may identify with more than one ethnicity.

The percentage of people born overseas was 56.3, compared with 27.1% nationally.

Although some people chose not to answer the census's question about religious affiliation, 39.8% had no religion, 38.4% were Christian, 0.4% had Māori religious beliefs, 5.0% were Hindu, 3.2% were Muslim, 3.2% were Buddhist and 2.8% had other religions.

Of those at least 15 years old, 423 (30.7%) people had a bachelor's or higher degree, and 204 (14.8%) people had no formal qualifications. The median income was $35,500, compared with $31,800 nationally. 243 people (17.6%) earned over $70,000 compared to 17.2% nationally. The employment status of those at least 15 was that 780 (56.6%) people were employed full-time, 171 (12.4%) were part-time, and 45 (3.3%) were unemployed.

Busway station
A busway station on the Eastern Busway will expect opening in 2026.

References

Suburbs of Auckland
Howick Local Board Area